Yarrunga is a small Aboriginal community, located 50 km north east of Halls Creek in the Kimberley region of Western Australia, within the Shire of Halls Creek.

History 

The Community was set up in the late 1980s largely as a community to house aged persons away from the Halls Creek townsite.

Governance 

The community is managed through its incorporated body, Yarrunga Aboriginal Corporation, incorporated under the Aboriginal Councils and Associations Act 1976 on 15 September 1983.

Town planning 

Yarrunga Layout Plan No.1 has been prepared in accordance with State Planning Policy 3.2 Aboriginal Settlements. Layout Plan No.1 is yet to be endorsed by the community. As such the Layout Plan exists only as a draft. The DRAFT Layout Plan map-set and background report can be viewed at Planning Western Australia's website.

References

External links 
 Office of the Registrar of Indigenous Corporations

Towns in Western Australia
Aboriginal communities in Kimberley (Western Australia)